The men's marathon at the 1988 Summer Olympics in Seoul, South Korea was held on Sunday October 2, 1988. The race started at 14:30h local time. A total of 98 athletes completed the race, with Polin Belisle from Belize finishing in last position in 3'14:02. There were 118 competitors from 60 countries. Twenty of them did not finish. The maximum number of athletes per nation had been set at 3 since the 1930 Olympic Congress. The event was won by Gelindo Bordin of Italy, the nation's first victory in the Olympic men's marathon and first medal in the event since 1924. Kenya (Douglas Wakiihuri's silver) and Djibouti (Hussein Ahmed Salah's bronze) each won their first Olympic men's marathon medal.

Background

This was the 21st appearance of the event, which is one of 12 athletics events to have been held at every Summer Olympics. Returning runners from the 1984 marathon included silver medalist John Treacy of Ireland, bronze medalist Charlie Spedding of Great Britain, fifth-place finisher Robert de Castella of Australia, and sixth-place finisher Juma Ikangaa of Tanzania. The favorites included de Castella, Gelindo Bordin of Italy, and rising star Hussein Ahmed Salah of Djibouti. Douglas Wakiihuri of Kenya had won the 1987 world championship over Ahmed Salah and Bordin.

American Samoa, Angola, Belize, (the People's Republic of) China, Fiji, Guam, Guinea, the Maldives, Niger, Rwanda, and the Solomon Islands each made their first appearance in Olympic men's marathons. The United States made its 20th appearance, most of any nation, having missed only the boycotted 1980 Games.

Gary Fanelli of the United States moved to Tafuna, American Samoa six months prior to the 1988 Summer Olympics in Seoul in order to coach and attain his Olympic eligibility for America Samoa. Fanelli's time of 2:25:35, good for 51st place, is an American Samoan national record.

Competition format and course

As all Olympic marathons, the competition was a single race. The marathon distance of 26 miles, 385 yards was run over an out-and-back route starting and finishing at the Olympic Stadium, running along the Han River.

Records

These were the standing world and Olympic records prior to the 1988 Summer Olympics.

No new world or Olympic bests were set during the competition.

Schedule

All times are Korea Standard Time adjusted for daylight savings (UTC+10)

Results

See also
 1986 Men's European Championships Marathon (Stuttgart)
 1987 Men's World Championships Marathon (Rome)
 1990 Men's European Championships Marathon (Split)
 1991 Men's World Championships Marathon (Tokyo)
 1992 Men's Olympic Marathon (Barcelona)

References

External links
  Official Report
  Marathon Info

M
Marathons at the Olympics
1988 marathons
Men's marathons
Men's events at the 1988 Summer Olympics